A sarong party girl (also known as an SPG) is a woman in Singapore and (to a lesser extent) Peninsular Malaysia of Chinese ethnicity who exclusively dates or socializes with men of European origin.

Etymology
The term "Sarong party girl" has its fairly innocuous roots in the late 1940s to early 1950s when Singapore was still ruled by the British Empire. As a general practice, the British forces personnel socialised very much among themselves, according to their military ranks and status (i.e. officers as opposed to enlisted men). However, there were some instances when specific local Singaporean "guests" were invited to social functions hosted by the British. The term "Sarong party" came into use to describe social functions which included local invited "ladies" who wore the sarong, a native word for a wrap-around skirt popular among local Singaporean men and women of the time.

Common stereotypes
Historically, the stereotypical "Sarong party girl" had a false foreign accent, was provocatively dressed, and exclusively dated or preferred white men either resident in Singapore or foreigners. The Sarong party girl stereotype in local entertainment is usually portrayed as a gold-digging, husband-snatching Asian woman, and this perception contributed much to Singapore's decadent image in the 1970s, as seen in films such as Saint Jack. Due to these stereotypes, women who are classified as Sarong party girls often have to endure negative sweeping statements. The Sarong party girl stereotype was popularised by a series of humorous books by Australian writer Jim Aitchison in the 1990s, offering a satirical portrayal of the SPG and related aspects of Singaporean culture. Over time, the term has taken on a somewhat more derogatory meaning. Nowadays, Sarong party girls are no longer identified by a unique dress code or appearance, referring simply to any local woman who prefers to socialize with males of a Caucasian ethnicity, particularly for romantic or sexual relationships. A Sarong party girl is commonly perceived as a fetishist who is racist and discriminates against their own community and race stemming from self-hatred, while showing a favoritism towards white people and effectively abandoning their Asian identity.

See also
Ang mo
Amejo
Asian fetish
Colonial mentality
Internalized racism
Pinkerton Syndrome
Yellow cab (stereotype)

Bibliography

References

External links

Dictionary definitions
from the Coxford Singlish Dictionary
from A Dictionary of Singlish and Singapore English

Articles
"Naked Blogger Attracts Thousands" (13 June 2005) from the Sydney Morning Herald

Pejorative terms for women
Singlish
Interpersonal relationships
Dating